Embraer Unidade Gavião Peixoto Airport  is a private airport located near Gavião Peixoto, São Paulo, Brazil. It is owned and operated by Embraer and used for testing civil and military aircraft.

History
In October 2001 Embraer opened a plant on the Aerodrome of Gavião Peixoto, near Araraquara, to house the final assembly of aircraft and to test equipment and technology. For this purpose, Embraer built runway 02/20 with 4,967 x 45 m, considered to be the longest public use runway in the Americas and the fifth longest in the world. Even so, only 2,975 m are actually used - the rest is taken up by a displaced threshold. Embraer offers customer support for its clientele on the site.

The plant manufactures the wings of the Embraer 190 and 195, the Embraer EMB 314 Super Tucano and Embraer KC-390 aircraft, the refurbishing of the Northrop F-5 of the Brazilian Air Force, and since 2008 the final assembly of Phenom 100 and Phenom 300 aircraft.

Airlines and destinations
No scheduled flights operate at this airport.

Access

See also

List of airports in Brazil

References

External links

Airports in São Paulo (state)
Embraer